"Don't Expect Me to Be Your Friend" is a song written and recorded by American singer Lobo that appears on his album Of a Simple Man. Released in 1972, the single peaked at No. 8 on the US Billboard Hot 100 and was his third of four songs to top the Billboard Easy Listening chart, where it had a two-week stay at No. 1. Internationally, it peaked at No. 4 in Australia, Canada, and New Zealand.

Track listings
Standard 7-inch single
A. "Don't Expect Me to Be Your Friend" – 3:33
B. "A Big Red Kite" – 4:02

Japanese 7-inch single
A. "Don't Expect Me to Be Your Friend" – 3:38
B. "Running Deer" – 3:25

Charts

Weekly charts

Year-end charts

Cover versions
Jamaican reggae singer Wayne Wade also recorded a reggae-tinged cover of this song, retitled "I Love You Too Much", in 1991.

See also
List of number-one adult contemporary singles of 1973 (U.S.)

References

1972 singles
1972 songs
Big Tree Records singles
Lobo (musician) songs
Philips Records singles
Songs written by Lobo (musician)